Březná is a river in the Czech Republic. It is a tributary of the Moravská Sázava, which it joins in Hoštejn.

External links

Rivers of the Olomouc Region
Rivers of the Pardubice Region